Zambada is a surname. Notable people with the surname include:

Ismael Zambada García (born 1948), Mexican drug lord
Serafín Zambada Ortiz (born 1990), U.S.-born Mexican drug trafficker
Vicente Zambada Niebla (born 1975), Mexican drug trafficker